Violin Concerto No. 5 may refer to any composers' fifth violin concerto:

 Violin Concerto No. 5 (Mozart) in A Major
 Violin Concerto No. 5 (Paganini) in A minor
 Violin Concerto No. 5 (Vieuxtemps) in A minor

See also 
List of compositions for violin and orchestra